Kukeneh (also Romanized as Kūkeneh, Kūkaneh, Koo Kanah, and Kowkaneh; also known as Kokene and Kūganeh) is a village in Blukat Rural District, Rahmatabad and Blukat District, Rudbar County, Gilan Province, Iran. At the 2006 census, its population was 773, in 214 families.

References 

Populated places in Rudbar County